The girls’ 800 m competition at the 2014 Summer Youth Olympics was held on 20–23 August 2014 in Nanjing Olympic Sports Center.

Schedule

Results

Heats
Eight fastest athletes advanced to Final A, the others advanced to Final B, or C according to their times.

Finals

Final A

Final B

Final C

External links
 iaaf.org - Women's 800m
 Nanjing 2014 - Athletics Official Results Book
 

Athletics at the 2014 Summer Youth Olympics